Sarath Mandava is an Indian screenwriter, director, cinematographer and executive producer known for his works in Tamil cinema, and Telugu cinema. 
In 2012, he has written/ co-written Ajith Kumar's Billa II as screenplay and story writer. Sarath made his directorial debut with a political thriller Tamil version film Ko 2.

Filmography

As director/writer

As cinematographer

As executive producer

References

Tamil film directors
Telugu film directors
20th-century births
Living people
Telugu male actors
American male actors of Indian descent
Film directors from Andhra Pradesh
Film directors from Tamil Nadu
Southern New Hampshire University alumni
People from Ongole
Date of birth missing (living people)
Year of birth missing (living people)